The Labour Party (PTr) is a centre-left social-democratic political party in Mauritius. It is one of four main Mauritian political parties along, with the Mauritian Militant Movement (MMM), the Militant Socialist Movement (MSM) and the Parti Mauricien Social Démocrate (PMSD). As a member of the Labour Party-MMM alliance, it elected four Members of Parliament in the general election of 2014. The party is led by Navin Ramgoolam.

Founded in 1936, the Labour Party remains the oldest major political party in the Republic and was in power from 1948 to 1982, from 1995 to 2000 and from 2005 to 2014. From 1983 to 1990 it formed part of a coalition government as a minority partner.

History
The Mauritius Labour Party was founded in 1936. Its founding principles mirrored those of the British Labour Party: to protect workers' rights and freedoms and support a higher wage rate with paid leave. The movement was encouraged by fifty-five conferences held by the party leaders throughout the country. Among other goals were resolutions to obtain suffrage for working class representation in the Legislative Council, establish a Department of Labour, prohibit capitalist exploitation of sugar plantations and implement socialist values among Mauritian government agencies.

The party founders were Maurice Curé, Jean Prosper, Mamode Assenjee, Hassenjee Jeetoo, Barthelemy Ohsan, Samuel Barbe, Emmanuel Anquetil, Godefroy Moutia and Pandit Sahadeo. Cure served as President of the Party until he was forced to resign in 1941, at which point Anquetil took over. Anquetil died in December 1946, and Guy Rozemont served as leader until his death in 1956 at age forty-one.

The arrival of Seewoosagur Ramgoolam in 1958 marked an important step. He was in favor of an independent Mauritius within the Commonwealth of Nations. Following the victory of the Independence Party in the general election of 1967, a constitutional agreement was made in Parliament following conferences in Lancaster and London. The coalition government, including the Labour Party, and the IFB and CAM sealed the pact for Independence. The Labour Party, led by Ramgoolam, along with Veerasamy Ringadoo, Satcam Boolell and Harold Walter, in coalition with the CAM led by Abdool Razack Mohamed and the IFB led by Sookdeo Bissoondoyal, pushed a motion in the Legislative Council to provide for an independent country to be declared on 12 March 1968.

The Labour Party joined forces with PMSD of Gaetan Duval in 1969 to form a coalition government. In December 1976, Labour won only 28 seats out of 70, as opposed to 34 for the Bérenger's MMM Boodhoo's PSM, but remained in power by forming another alliance with the PMSD. In 1982, however, the MMM won outright, and Ramgoolam even lost his parliamentary seat. Anerood Jugnauth of the MSM became Prime Minister. From 1983 through 1995, the Labour Party attracted little electoral support; and in 1984, Satcam Boolell, who had replaced Ramgoolam as party leader, agreed to an electoral alliance with the Militant Socialist Movement, which had broken away from the MMM.

In 1995 Labour returned to power with MMM's support. Navin Ramgoolam, who had taken over the party leadership in 1991, became Prime Minister. It lost the subsequent legislative election in 2000, however: its coalition with the Mauritian Party of Xavier-Luc Duval secured only 36.6% of the popular vote and eight of seventy seats.

Labour returned to power in the 2005 elections as part of the Alliance Sociale, which won 42 of the 70 seats. In the general election of 2010, the party formed the majority of L'Alliance de L'Avenir, which regrouped the Mauritius Labour Party, the MSM and the PMSD. The Alliance de L'Avenir won the 2010 general election with forty-one seats against eighteen seats for the MMM-led L'Alliance du Coeur, with one seat taken by the FSM. However, on 6 August 2011 the Alliance broke down, leaving only the Mauritius Labour Party, the PMSD and the Republican Movement (MR) in the government. The 2014 general elections saw the victory of a MSM-PMSD-ML coalition (known as "L'alliance Lepep"). Labour Party lost and voters rejected government plans to expand presidential powers. In November 2019 elections, Mauritius’ ruling Militant Socialist Movement (MSM) won more than half of the seats and Labour Party lost again, securing incumbent Prime Minister Pravind Kumar Jugnauth a new five-year term.

Past leaders

 1936-1941 Maurice Curé
 1941-1946 Emmanuel Anquetil
 1946-1956 Guy Rozemont
 1956-1959 Renganaden Seeneevassen 
 1959-1984 Seewoosagur Ramgoolam 
 1984-1991 Satcam Boolell
 1991–present Navin Ramgoolam

Parliament results

See also

References

Labour parties
Political parties in Mauritius
Full member parties of the Socialist International
Social democratic parties in Africa
Socialist parties in Mauritius
Main
Political parties established in 1936
1936 establishments in Mauritius